To weigh something is to measure its weight.

Weigh may also refer to:

Naval
 Weigh anchor, the process of raising a ship's anchor in preparation for departure, or the events during or prior
 Weigh lock, a type of canal lock used to determine the weight of barges or ships

People
 Stephen Weigh (born 1987), Australian professional basketball player

Weight related
 Weigh-in, in boxing, wrestling, bodybuilding, etc., the process or event of measuring a potential competitor's weight to determine his or her correct weight class
 Weigh bridge or truck scale, a device to weigh large vehicles
 Weigh house, a building within which items are weighed, typically goods to be sold by weight

See also
 WAE (disambiguation)
 Way (disambiguation)
 Wei (disambiguation)
 Wey (disambiguation)
 Whey